Sterile alpha motif and leucine zipper containing kinase AZK, also known as ZAK, is a human gene.

This gene is a member of the MAPKKK family of signal transduction molecules and encodes a protein with an N-terminal kinase catalytic domain, followed by a leucine zipper motif and a sterile-alpha motif (SAM). This magnesium-binding protein forms homodimers and is located in the cytoplasm. The protein mediates gamma radiation signaling leading to cell cycle arrest and activity of this protein plays a role in cell cycle checkpoint regulation in cells. The protein also has pro-apoptotic activity. Alternate transcriptional splice variants, encoding different isoforms, have been characterized.

Interactions 
ZAK has been shown to interact with ZNF33A.

References

Further reading 

 
 
 
 
 
 
 
 
 
 
 
 
 
 
 
 
 
 
 
 

EC 2.7.11